
Gisgo or Gisco is the latinization or hellenization (Géskōn) of the Punic masculine given name Gersakkun. The name means "Client of the god Sakkun."

Notable people with the name Gisgo or Gisco include:

 Gisco, a son of Carthaginian general Hamilcar, exiled after the Battle of Himera in 480 BC
 Gisco (died 239 BC), a Carthaginian general who served during the closing years of the First Punic War and took a leading part in the events which sparked the Mercenary War
 Gisgo, son of Hanno the Great, who was a notable general of the Sicilian campaigns of the First Punic War
 Gisco, one of three ambassadors sent by Hannibal to King Philip V of Macedon in 215 BC
 Gisgo, a Carthaginian officer at the Battle of Cannae who, noting the great size of the Roman army, provoked Hannibal's retort, "Another thing that has escaped your notice, Gisgo, is even more amazing: That, although there are so many of them, there is not one among them called Gisgo."
 Gisco, a Carthaginian who argued against the peace terms offered by Scipio Africanus after the Battle of Zama in 202 BC
 Gisco, Carthaginian magistrate who opposed negotiations with Rome in 152 BC before the Third Punic War
 Gisco Strytanus, ambassador to Rome in 146 BC

See also
 Hasdrubal Gisco ("Hasdrubal, son of Gisco"; died 202BC), Carthaginian military commander in the Second Punic War
 Hannibal Gisco ("Hannibal, son of Gisco"; –260BC), Carthaginian military commander

References

Citations

Bibliography
 . 
 .